The 2021–22 season was the 91st season in the existence of Wolfsberger AC and the club's tenth consecutive season in the top flight of Austrian football. In addition to the domestic league, Wolfsberger AC participated in this season's edition of the Austrian Cup.

Players

First-team squad

Out on loan

Transfers

Pre-season and friendlies

Competitions

Overall record

Austrian Football Bundesliga

Regular stage

Results summary

Results by round

Matches
The league fixtures were announced on 22 June 2021.

Championship round

Austrian Cup

References

Wolfsberger AC seasons
Wolfsberger AC